Eleven Kinds of Loneliness is a collection of short stories written by Richard Yates from 1951 to 1961.  All of the stories also appeared in the posthumously released Richard Yates, The Collected Stories (2004), which includes other stories.

Contents
"Doctor Jack-o'-lan

"The Best of Everything"
"Jody Rolled The Bones"
"No Pain Whatsoever"
"A Glutton for Punishment"
"A Wrestler with Sharks"
"Fun with a Stranger"
"The B.A.R. Man"
"A Really Good Jazz Piano"
"Out with the Old"
"Builders"

References

1962 short story collections
Short story collections by Richard Yates
Little, Brown and Company books
Manhattan in fiction